San Pedro is a small village in the Corozal District in the nation of Belize with a population of 519 in 2010. San Pedro are people of mainly from Maya Yucatec ethnicity and they speak Yucatec Maya and Spanish very well along with some English.

References

Populated places in Corozal District